Uchtepa is an urban-type settlement in Jizzakh Region, Uzbekistan. It is the administrative center of Sharof Rashidov District. The town population in 1989 was 4,824 people.

References

Populated places in Jizzakh Region
Urban-type settlements in Uzbekistan